The Hakataramea River flows generally south through the Hakataramea Valley, which is separated from the more inland Mackenzie Basin by the Kirkliston Range in Canterbury, New Zealand.

A major tributary of the Waitaki River, it flows for  before joining the river from the northeast just below the town of Kurow in the village of Hakataramea.

References

Rivers of Canterbury, New Zealand
Rivers of New Zealand